{{DISPLAYTITLE:C8H5NO3}}
The molecular formula C8H5NO3 (molar mass: 163.13 g/mol, exact mass: 163.0269 u) may refer to:

 N-Hydroxyphthalimide
 Isatoic anhydride

Molecular formulas